John Allan Chapman (July 14, 1965 – March 4, 2002) was a combat controller in the United States Air Force who was posthumously awarded the Medal of Honor on August 22, 2018, for his actions in the Battle of Takur Ghar during the War in Afghanistan. He is the first airman to receive the Medal of Honor since the Vietnam War. He was inducted into the Hall of Heroes on August 23, 2018, and posthumously promoted to Master Sergeant on the following day.

Chapman was also the first Air Force combat controller to be awarded the Air Force Cross. His award was subsequently upgraded to the Medal of Honor.

Early life
John Chapman was born July 14, 1965, in Springfield, Massachusetts to Eugene and Terry Chapman and grew up in Windsor Locks, Connecticut. He had two sisters, Lori and Tammy, and a brother, Kevin. He graduated from Windsor Locks High School in 1983.

Military career

Information Systems Operator

Chapman enlisted in the United States Air Force on September 27, 1985, and was trained as an information systems operator. His first assignment was with the 1987th Information Systems Squadron at Lowry Air Force Base, Colorado from February 1986 to June 1989.

Combat Control Operator
Chapman retrained into the combat control career field and served with the 1721st Combat Control Squadron at Pope Air Force Base, North Carolina from August 1990 to November 1992.

He was a Special Tactics team member with the 320th Special Tactics Squadron at Kadena Air Base on Okinawa from November 1992 to October 1995. His final assignment was with the 24th Special Tactics Squadron at Pope Air Force Base.

Operation Enduring Freedom

On March 4, 2002, Chapman and members of the United States Navy SEALs took part in Operation Anaconda. A Boeing CH-47 Chinook came under enemy fire, causing Navy SEAL Neil C. Roberts to fall. Once on the ground, Chapman provided directions to another helicopter to pick them up. He and the team volunteered to rescue Roberts from the enemy stronghold.

Upon returning to recover Roberts, the team came under fire from three directions. Chapman charged forward, killing two enemy soldiers and advancing towards a defensive fighting position from minimal personal cover, and he received multiple wounds. His engagement and destruction of the first enemy position and advancement to the second enabled his team to move to cover and break enemy contact. He is credited with saving the lives of the entire rescue team.

Air Force Cross upgraded to the Medal of Honor
Chapman was posthumously awarded the Air Force Cross. The citation for the award reads:

Fourteen years after Chapman's death, Air Force Secretary Deborah Lee James began pushing for a Medal of Honor, the military's highest award, after new technology that allowed a deeper analysis of video of the battle suggested Chapman regained consciousness and resumed fighting Al-Qaeda members who were coming toward him from three directions. Chapman may have crawled into a bunker, shot and killed an enemy charging at him and then killed another enemy fighter in hand-to-hand combat.

While the Air Force pushed for Chapman to be recognized, Naval Special Warfare Command allegedly attempted to block Chapman's Medal of Honor as it would result in an admission that Chapman had been left behind. When it became apparent that Chapman's Medal of Honor could not be blocked, it was further alleged that the Navy put the commander of the operation, Britt K. Slabinski, up for the same award, which he received in May 2018. In March 2018, Chapman's family was notified that his Air Force Cross was to be upgraded to the Medal of Honor.

The citation accompanying his upgrade to the Medal of Honor reads as follows:

The ceremony took place Wednesday, August 22, 2018. At an August 23 ceremony at the Pentagon attended by family and teammates, Chapman was inducted into the Hall of Heroes, a room dedicated to honor Medal of Honor recipients. The next day, he was posthumously promoted to the rank of Master Sergeant and his name was added to the Medal of Honor wall at the Air Force Memorial.

Personal life
Chapman met Valerie Novak in 1990 while he and a friend were visiting her hometown of Windber, Pennsylvania. They married in 1992 and had two daughters, Madison and Brianna.
Chapman is buried at Saint Mary's Byzantine Catholic Church Cemetery in Windber.

Awards and decorations
Chapman received the following awards and decorations:

Legacy
Chapman's actions in the Battle of Takur Ghar were recorded from multiple angles from circling aircraft and are reported to be the first Medal of Honor actions ever recorded on video.

The Military Sealift Command logistics ship MV TSgt John A. Chapman (T-AK-323) was renamed in his honor in 2005.

Dan Schilling and Chapman's sister, Lori Chapman Longfritz, wrote a book based on his Medal of Honor action titled Alone at Dawn: Medal of Honor Recipient John Chapman and the Untold Story of the World's Deadliest Special Operations Force. It has also been optioned for a feature adaptation by Thruline Entertainment. In 2021, it was revealed the film would be called Combat Control, directed by Sam Hargrave and starring Jake Gyllenhaal as Chapman.

See also
List of post-Vietnam War Medal of Honor recipients

References

External links

The First Medal of Honor Ever Recorded - overhead video footage of TSgt Chapman's combat actions. 

1965 births
2002 deaths
People from Windsor Locks, Connecticut
People from Springfield, Massachusetts
Military personnel from Massachusetts
United States Air Force non-commissioned officers
United States Air Force personnel of the War in Afghanistan (2001–2021)
War in Afghanistan (2001–2021) recipients of the Medal of Honor
United States Air Force Medal of Honor recipients
American military personnel killed in the War in Afghanistan (2001–2021)
Recipients of the Air Force Cross (United States)